Berta proper, a.k.a. Gebeto, is spoken by the Berta (also Bertha, Barta, Burta) in Sudan and Ethiopia.

The three Berta languages, Gebeto, Fadashi and Undu, are often considered dialects of a single language.  Berta proper includes the dialects Bake, Dabuso, Gebeto, Mayu, and Shuru; the dialect name Gebeto may be extended to all of Berta proper.

Phonology

Consonants 

 Voiced plosives /b, d, ɡ/ may be heard as voiceless [p, t, k] in free variation, word-initially or word-finally.
 A glottal stop [ʔ] mainly occurs between vowels, and may also be heard before word-initial vowel sounds.
 Nasal-stop sequences may occur morpheme-initially as [mb, nd, ŋɡ, ŋkʼ].
 /ŋ/ is heard as [ɲ] when preceding a front vowel /i/ or /e/.
 /kʼ/ is heard as a palatal [cʼ] when before front vowels.
 /ɡ/ can be heard as voiced palatal [ɟ] or as a voiceless palatal [c] when before front vowels.
 /h/ in word-final position can be heard as a fricative [x].
 /s, θ/ may sometimes occur as slightly voiced [z, ð] in vocalic or nasal environments.

Vowels 

 If a non-closed vowel sound, /ɛ/ or /ɔ/, are adjacent to a closed vowel sound like /i/ or /u/ within vowel harmony, they are then heard as more closed [e, o].

Pronouns
The pronouns of Berta are as follows:

See also
Berta word lists (Wiktionary)

References

Bibliography
 Torben Andersen. "Aspects of Berta phonology".  Afrika und Übersee 76: pp. 41–80.
 Torben Andersen. "Absolutive and Nominative in Berta".  ed. Nicolai & Rottland, Fifth Nilo-Saharan Linguistics Colloquium.  Nice, 24–29 August 1992.  Proceedings. (Nilo-Saharan 10).  Köln: Rüdiger Köppe Verlag. 1995.  pp. 36–49.
 M. Lionel Bender.  "Berta Lexicon".  In Bender (ed.), Topics in Nilo-Saharan Linguistics (Nilo-Saharan 3), pp. 271–304.  Hamburg: Helmut Buske Verlag 1989.
 E. Cerulli. "Three Berta dialects in western Ethiopia", Africa, 1947.
 Susanne Neudorf & Andreas Neudorf: Bertha - English - Amharic Dictionary. Addis Ababa: Benishangul-Gumuz Language Development Project 2007.
 A. N. Tucker & M. A. Bryan.  Linguistic Analyses: The Non-Bantu Languages of North-Eastern Africa. London: Oxford University Press 1966.
 A. Triulzi, A. A. Dafallah, and M. L. Bender.  "Berta". In Bender (ed.), The Non-Semitic Languages of Ethiopia.  East Lansing, Michigan: African Studies Center, Michigan State University 1976, pp. 513–532.

External links
 World Atlas of Language Structures information on Berta
 Website maintained by the language community, including published literature and an online dictionary

Berta languages
Languages of Sudan
Languages of Ethiopia
Subject–verb–object languages